Frank Borzage (April 23, 1894 – June 19, 1962) was an Academy Award-winning American film director and actor, known for directing 7th Heaven (1927), Street Angel (1928), Bad Girl (1931), A Farewell to Arms (1932), Man's Castle (1933), History Is Made at Night (1937), The Mortal Storm (1940) and Moonrise (1948).

Biography
Borzage's father, Luigi Borzaga, was born in Ronzone (then Austrian Empire, now Italy) in 1859. As a stonemason, he sometimes worked in Switzerland; he met his future wife, Maria Ruegg (1860, Switzerland1947, Los Angeles), where she worked in a silk factory. Borzaga emigrated to Hazleton, Pennsylvania]in the early 1880s, where he worked as a coal miner. He brought his fiancée to the United States, and they married in Hazleton in 1883.

Their first child, Henry, was born in 1885. The Borzaga family moved to Salt Lake City, Utah, where Frank Borzage was born in 1894, and the family remained there until 1919. The couple had 14 children, eight of whom survived childhood: Henry (1885–1971), Mary Emma (1886–1906), Bill (1892–1973), Frank, Daniel (1896–1975, a performer and member of the John Ford Stock Company), Lew (1898–1974), Dolly (1901–2002) and Sue (1905–1998). Luigi Borzaga died in Los Angeles in a car accident in 1934; his wife Maria (Frank's mother) died of cancer in 1947.

Career
In 1912, Frank Borzage found employment as an actor in Hollywood; he continued to work as an actor until 1917. His directorial debut came in 1915 with the film The Pitch o' Chance.

Borzage was a successful director throughout the 1920s; he reached his peak in the late silent and early sound era. Absorbing visual influences from the German director F.W. Murnau, who was also resident at Fox at this time, he developed his own style of lushly visual romanticism in a hugely successful series of films starring Janet Gaynor and Charles Farrell, including 7th Heaven (1927), for which he won the first Academy Award for Best Director, Street Angel (1928) and Lucky Star (1929). He won a second Oscar for 1931's Bad Girl.

He directed 14 films from 1917 to 1919 alone; his greatest success in the silent era was with Humoresque (1920), a box-office winner starring Vera Gordon.

Borzage's trademark was intense identification with the feelings of young lovers in the face of adversity, with love in his films triumphing over such trials as World War I (7th Heaven and A Farewell to Arms), disability (Lucky Star), the Depression (Man's Castle), a thinly disguised version of the Titanic disaster in History Is Made at Night, and the rise of Nazism, a theme which Borzage had virtually to himself among Hollywood filmmakers, including Little Man, What Now? (1933), Three Comrades (1938), and The Mortal Storm (1940).

His work took a spiritual turn in films such as Green Light (1937), Strange Cargo (1940) and The Big Fisherman (1959). Of his later work, only Moonrise (1948) has enjoyed much critical acclaim.

After 1948, his output was sporadic.

In 1955 and 1957, Borzage was awarded The George Eastman Award, given by George Eastman House for distinguished contribution to the art of film.
For his contributions to the film industry, Borzage received a motion pictures star on the Hollywood Walk of Fame in 1960. The star is located at 6300 Hollywood Boulevard.

He was the original director of Journey Beneath the Desert (1961), but was too unwell to continue, and Edgar G. Ulmer took over. Borzage was uncredited for the sequences he did direct.

While hospitalized in February 1962, he received the D. W. Griffith Award.

He was an officer and board member of the Directors Guild of America.

Personal life
On June 7, 1916, Borzage married vaudeville and film actress Lorena "Rena" Rogers in Los Angeles and remained married until 1941. In 1945, he married Edna Stillwell Skelton, the ex-wife of comedian Red Skelton; they were divorced in 1949. His marriage to Juanita Scott in 1953 lasted till his death nine years later.

He was a keen sportsman, with a 3-goal polo handicap and a two handicap in golf, and a yachtsman.

Borzage died of cancer in 1962, aged 68, and he was interred in the Forest Lawn Memorial Park Cemetery in Glendale, California.

Filmography

Director

 The Battle of Gettysburg (1913)
 Granddad (1913)
 The Mystery of Yellow Aster Mine (1913)
 The Gratitude of Wanda (1913)
 The Geisha (1914)
 Samson (1914)
 The Wrath of the Gods (1914)
 The Typhoon (1914)
 Knight of the Trail (1915)
 The Pitch o' Chance (1915)
 The Pride and the Man (1916)
 Dollars of Dross (1916)
 Life's Harmony (1916)
 The Silken Spider (1916)
 The Code of Honor (1916)
 Two Bits (1916)
 A Flickering Light (1916)
 Unlucky Luke (1916)
 Jack (1916)
 The Pilgrim (1916)
 The Demon of Fear (1916)
 The Quicksands of Deceit (1916)
 Nugget Jim's Pardner (1916)
 That Gal of Burke's (1916)
 The Courtin' of Calliope Clew (1916)
 Nell Dale's Men Folks (1916)
 The Forgotten Prayer (1916)
 Matchin' Jim (1916)
 Land o' Lizards (1916)
 Immediate Lee (1916)
 Flying Colors (1917)
 Until They Get Me (1917)
 A Mormon Maid (1917)
 Wee Lady Betty (1917)
 The Gun Woman (1918)
 The Curse of Iku (1918)
 The Shoes That Danced (1918)
 Innocent's Progress (1918)
 Society for Sale (1918)
 An Honest Man (1918)
 Who Is to Blame? (1918)
 The Ghost Flower (1918)
 The Atom (1918)
 Toton the Apache (1919)
 Whom the Gods Would Destroy (1919)
 Prudence on Broadway (1919)
 Humoresque (1920)
 Get-Rich-Quick Wallingford (1921)
 The Duke of Chimney Butte (1921)
 Back Pay (1922)
 Billy Jim (1922)
 The Good Provider (1922)
 The Valley of Silent Men (1922)
 The Pride of Palomar (1922)
 The Nth Commandment (1923)
 Children of Dust (1923)
 The Age of Desire (1923)
 Secrets (1924)
 The Lady (1925)
 Daddy's Gone A-Hunting (1925)
 The Circle (1925)
 Lazybones (1925)
 Wages for Wives (1925)
 The First Year (1926)
 The Dixie Merchant (1926)
 Early to Wed (1926)
 Marriage License? (1926)
 7th Heaven (1927)
 Street Angel (1928)
 Lucky Star (1929)
 They Had to See Paris (1929)
 The River (1929)
 Song o' My Heart (1930)
 Liliom (1930)
 Doctors' Wives (1931)
 Young as You Feel (1931)
 Bad Girl (1931)
 After Tomorrow (1932)
 Young America (1932)
 A Farewell to Arms (1932)
 Secrets (1933)
 Man's Castle (1933)
 No Greater Glory (1934)
 Little Man, What Now? (1934)
 Flirtation Walk (1934)
 Living on Velvet (1935)
 Stranded (1935)
 Shipmates Forever (1935)
 Desire (1936)
 Hearts Divided (1936)
 Green Light (1937)
 History Is Made at Night (1937)
 Big City (1937)
 Mannequin (1937)
 Three Comrades (1938)
 The Shining Hour (1938)
 Disputed Passage (1939)
 I Take This Woman (1940)
 Strange Cargo (1940)
 The Mortal Storm (1940)
 Flight Command (1940)
 Billy the Kid (1941)
 Smilin' Through (1941)
 The Vanishing Virginian (1942)
 Seven Sweethearts (1942)
 Stage Door Canteen (1943)
 His Butler's Sister (1943)
 Till We Meet Again (1944)
 The Spanish Main (1945)
 I've Always Loved You (1946)
 Magnificent Doll (1946)
 That's My Man (1947)
 Moonrise (1948)
 China Doll (1958)
 The Big Fisherman (1959)
 Journey Beneath the Desert (1961)

Actor
 The Battle of Gettysburg (1913) - minor role, uncredited
 The Gratitude of Wanda (1913, short)
 Samson (1914) - Bearded Philistine, uncredited
 The Wrath of the Gods (1914) - Tom Wilson
 The Typhoon (1914) - Renard Bernisky
 The Cup of Life (1915) - Dick Ralston
 Intolerance (1916) - minor role, uncredited
 Land o' Lizards (1916) - The Stranger
 Immediate Lee (1916) - Immediate Lee
 The Pride and the Man (1916)
 A School for Husbands (1917) - Hugh Aslam
 A Mormon Maid (1917) - Tom Rigdon
 Wee Lady Betty (1917) - Roger O'Reilly
 Flying Colors (1917) - uncredited
 Fear Not (1917) - Franklin Shirley
 The Gun Woman (1918) - Townsman - uncredited
 The Curse of Iku (1918) - Allan Carroll / Allan Carroll III
 The Atom (1918)
 Jeanne Eagels (1957) - as himself, uncredited

In popular culture
 
Borzage briefly appears as a character in Horace McCoy's 1935 novel They Shoot Horses, Don't They?, when he attends its dance marathon setting as a spectator. The narrator, Robert Syverten, notices Borzage in the crowd and has a brief conversation with him, expressing his admiration of No Greater Glory and sharing his own ambition to become a film director.

References

Further reading
 Dumont, Hervé. Frank Borzage: the Life and Times of a Hollywood Romantic. McFarland, 2006.
 Lamster, Frederick. "Souls Made Great Through Love and Adversity": the Film Work of Frank Borzage. Scarecrow, 1981.

External links

 
 
 Senses of Cinema: Great Directors Critical Database
 They Shoot Pictures, Don't They?
 A Farewell to Arms (1932) – This Borzage-directed adaptation of Ernest Hemingway's novel has fallen into the public domain and is available online through the Internet Archive.
 Frank Borzage and the Classic Hollywood Style
 
 Frank Borzage at Virtual History

1894 births
1962 deaths
American male film actors
American male silent film actors
Best Directing Academy Award winners
Burials at Forest Lawn Memorial Park (Glendale)
Deaths from cancer in California
People from Hazleton, Pennsylvania
Male actors from Salt Lake City
People from Greater Los Angeles
Silent film directors
Film directors from California
Film directors from Utah
20th-century American male actors
American people of Italian descent
Film directors from Pennsylvania